Warm Up! is a 2000 single-player racing simulator developed by Lankhor and published by Microids for PlayStation and Windows.

Gameplay 
Warm Up! is essentially a Formula 1 game without the official license, consisting of both a simulation mode and an arcade mode.

Critical reception 
JeuxVideo praised the game's realism and addictive gameplay. On the contrary, Absolute Games offered a scathing review, deeming the title primitive and an insult to the simulator genre.

References

External links 
 Joystick (French)
 Generation 4 (French)

2000 video games
Formula One video games
Lankhor games
Microïds games
PlayStation (console) games
Racing simulators
Video games developed in France
Video games set in Australia
Video games set in Malaysia
Video games set in Brazil
Video games set in Spain
Video games set in Monaco
Video games set in Canada
Video games set in France
Video games set in the United Kingdom
Video games set in Germany
Video games set in Hungary
Video games set in Austria
Video games set in Belgium
Video games set in Italy
Video games set in Indiana
Video games set in Japan
Windows games